Contract for the Web is an initiative by the World Wide Web Foundation in November 2019 to attempt to address issues of political manipulation, fake news, privacy violations, and other malign forces on the internet.

History
The initiative is the product of work for more than a year by over 80 people drawn from government, businesses and the general public.

Initiative

The plan outlines nine central principles, three each directed at governments, companies and individuals.  It was launched 25 November 2019 by Tim Berners-Lee of the World Wide Web Foundation,  occurring before the start of the UN Internet Governance Forum meeting in Berlin.

Endorsing governments, companies and individuals make commitments to protecting the web from abuse and ensuring it benefits humanity.  The commitment is understood to be non-binding.

Principles

Contract for the web indicates principles 1 to 3 are for governments, 4 to 6 are for companies, and 7 to 9 are for citizens:
 "Ensure everyone can connect to the internet".
 "Keep all of the internet available, all of the time".
 "Respect and protect people’s fundamental online privacy and data rights".
 "Make the internet affordable and accessible to everyone".
 "Respect and protect people’s privacy and personal data to build online trust".
 "Develop technologies that support the best in humanity and challenge the worst".
 "Be creators and collaborators on the Web".
 "Build strong communities that respect civil discourse and human dignity".
 "Fight for the Web".

Adoption
By launch the plan was backed by over 150 organisations including names such as Google, Microsoft and Facebook.  Despite backing the plan, Facebook appeared to be ignoring Berners-Lee's request to Mark Zuckerberg to cease targeted political adverts for the 2019 United Kingdom general election.  Yasmin Alibhai-Brown gave the opinion in the United Kingdom's 'i news': "It’s just good PR and a fun game for the megalomaniacs who will carry on doing their worst".

References

Sources

Further reading

External links

 Official website
Internet safety
2019 introductions